Krzysztof Sieńko (born 15 June 1976) is a Polish bobsledder. He competed at the 1998 Winter Olympics and the 2002 Winter Olympics.

References

1976 births
Living people
Polish male bobsledders
Olympic bobsledders of Poland
Bobsledders at the 1998 Winter Olympics
Bobsledders at the 2002 Winter Olympics
People from Wałbrzych